Laurence Frederick Abbott (born 1950) is an American theoretical neuroscientist, who is currently the William Bloor Professor of Theoretical Neuroscience at Columbia University, where he helped create the Center for Theoretical Neuroscience. He is widely regarded as one of the leaders of theoretical neuroscience, and is coauthor, along with Peter Dayan, on the first comprehensive textbook on theoretical neuroscience, which is considered to be the standard text for students and researchers entering theoretical neuroscience. He helped invent the dynamic clamp method alongside Eve Marder.

Abbott has received numerous awards for his work in the field, including memberships in the National Academy of Sciences and the American Academy of Arts and Sciences. In 2010, he received the Swartz Prize for Theoretical and Computational Neuroscience. In 2022 he was awarded the Gruber Neuroscience Prize.

Biography
Abbott attended Oberlin College from 1968 to 1971, where he received a bachelors degree in physics. He subsequently attended graduate school at Brandeis University from 1973 to 1977, where he received his Ph.D. in physics. He subsequently worked in theoretical particle physics, serving as research associate at Stanford Linear Accelerator Center from 1977 to 1979, as a Scientific Associate at the Theory division at CERN from 1980 to 1981, and as a tenure track professor in the physics department at Brandeis from 1979 to 2005. Abbott began his transition to neuroscience research in 1989, joined the Department of Biology at Brandeis in 1993, and was the co-director of Brandeis Sloan Center for Theoretical Neurobiology from 1994 to 2002, the director of the Volen National Center for Complex Systems at Brandeis from 1997–2002, and a visiting faculty at UCSF Sloan Center for Theoretical Neuroscience from 1994 to 2002. At Brandeis, he held the position of the Nancy Lurie Marks Professor of Neuroscience from 1997 to 2002 and the Zalman Abraham Kekst Professor of Neuroscience from 2003 to 2005. In 2005, he joined the faculty of Columbia University, where he is currently a member of the Department of Neuroscience, and the Department of Physiology and Cellular Biophysics. He is co-director of the Center for Theoretical Neuroscience. He has been a senior fellow at HHMI Janelia Farm Research Campus since 2015.

Select publications

Awards, honors, and memberships
 Gruber Neuroscience Prize 2022
 National Institutes of Health Director's Pioneer Award
 Swartz Prize
 Israel Brain Technologies’ Mathematical Neuroscience Prize.
 First Annual Prize in Mathematical Neuroscience.
 Irving Institute Mentor of the Year Award.
 National Academy of Sciences member
 Member, Kavli Institute for Brain Science
 Member of the Motor Neuron Center, Columbia University
 Senior Fellow, HHMI Janelia Farm Research Campus
 American Academy of Arts and Sciences
 Fellow, American Association for the Advancement of Science
 Steering Committee, Safra Center for Brain Sciences, Hebrew University
 Scientific Advisory Panel, Gatsby Unit, UCL
 Advisory Council for Physics Department, Princeton University
 Scholars Selection Committee, McKnight Foundation
 Mindscope Advisory Council, Allen Institute for Brain Science
 Scientific Advisory Board, Champalimaud Neuroscience Program
 Brain and Cognitive Sciences Visiting Committee, MIT
 Scientific and Academic Advisory Committee, Weizmann Institute
 Executive Committee, Simons Collaboration on the Global Brain

Bibliography

References

External links

 Columbia Profile page
  Columbia Neurotheory page
 Simons Foundation Profile page
 National Academy of Science Member page

1950 births
Living people
American neuroscientists
Columbia Medical School faculty
Brandeis University faculty
Brandeis University alumni
Members of the United States National Academy of Sciences
Oberlin College alumni
People associated with CERN
American physicists
American textbook writers